David Lindsay, 2nd Lord Lindsay of the Byres (died 1490) was a Scottish lord of parliament and supporter of King James III of Scotland.

Battle of Sauchieburn
Lindsay of the Byres remained a supporter of James III of Scotland after his son Prince James had left Stirling Castle as the figurehead of a rival faction. He was present at the battle of Sauchieburn at Bannockburn on 11 June 1488. James III was killed. The historian Norman Macdougall finds the story of Robert Lindsay of Pitscottie that the King tried to escape on a horse provided by his ancestor Lord Lindsay unlikely.

References

1490 deaths
15th-century Scottish people
Lords of Parliament
Year of birth unknown